Resorts World is a hospitality and casino franchise owned by the Genting Group, a Malaysian conglomerate. The Resorts World brand is used across Genting Group's international resort and casino properties, and it's namesake cruise line Resorts World Cruises. Resorts World may refer to:

Southeast Asia 
 Resorts World Genting – Pahang, Malaysia (Formerly Genting Highlands Resort)
 Resorts World Awana – Pahang, Malaysia (Formerly Awana Genting Highlands Golf & Country Resort)
 Resorts World Kijal – Terengganu, Malaysia
 Resorts World Langkawi – Langkawi, Kedah, Malaysia
 Resorts World Manila – Newport City, Pasay, Philippines (renamed Newport World Resorts)
 Resorts World Sentosa – Sentosa Island, Singapore
 Resorts World Cruises – Singapore
 Westside City Resorts World – Entertainment City, Tambo, Parañaque, Metro Manila, Philippines (under construction)

Americas 
 Resorts World Las Vegas – Winchester, Nevada, United States 
 Resorts World New York City – Queens, New York City, United States
 Resorts World Catskills – Kiamesha Lake, New York, United States
 Resorts World Hudson Valley – Newburgh, New York, United States
 Resorts World Miami – Miami, Florida, United States (proposed)
 Resorts World Bimini – North Bimini, Bahamas

Europe 
Resorts World Birmingham – Solihull, Birmingham, United Kingdom

East Asia 
 Resorts World @ Macau – Nam Vam Lake, Macau (under construction)
Resorts World Jeju - Jeju Island, South Korea (project canceled, eventually developed as Jeju Shinhwa World)

External links 
Official website